Agonopterix adspersella is a moth of the family Depressariidae. It is found in southern Europe, Asia Minor, the Palestinian Territories, Iran and the Crimea.

The larvae feed on Bupleurum falcatum. They spin the leaves of their host plant together to create a shelter from which they feed. Pupation takes place on the ground in a spinning of sand grains.

References

Moths described in 1832
Agonopterix
Moths of Europe
Moths of Asia